Bogor Zoology Museum is a museum located to the next of the main entrance of the Bogor Botanical Gardens in the city of Bogor, Indonesia. The museum and its laboratory were founded in 1894 by government of Dutch East Indies during the colonial era. It contain one of the largest collection of preserved fauna specimens in Southeast Asia.

History
Bogor Zoology Museum was founded by Dr. J.C. Koningsberger in August 1894, and was originally just a small laboratory at the corner of the Bogor Botanical Garden (formerly known as 's Lands Plantentuin).

Inspired by his visit to Sri Lanka in 1898, J. Koningsberger went to collect Animals specimen for researches with assistance of Dr Melchior Treub. In 1906 the museum and the laboratory were combined, and renamed . In 1912 at the museum, Peter Ouwens wrote the first scientific description of Komodo Dragon. The museum has been known by its current name since Indonesia gained its independence in 1950.

In 1987 the institution known as Zoologicum Bogoriense was renamed Research association and zoology development (Balai Penelitian dan Pengembangan Zoologi) which is under Pusat Penelitian dan pengembangan biologi (Puslitbang Biologi) (institute of research and development of biology). The collection currently held by the museum was enhanced in 1997 using grants from the world bank and the Japanese government.

Collection

The museum collection includes fossilised and preserved animals:
 Mammals – 650 species and 30,000 specimens, including a rare mounted specimen of a Javan rhinoceros (Rhinoceros sondaicus)
 Birds – 1000 species and 30,762 specimens
 Reptiles and amphibians – 763 species and 19,937 specimens
 Insects – 12000 species and 2,580,000 specimens
 Molluscs – 959 species and 13,146 specimens
 Other invertebrates – 700 species and 15,558 specimens

There is also a skeleton of a blue whale (Balaenoptera musculus), the biggest of its kind in Indonesia.

References

Bogor
Museums in West Java
Natural history museums in Indonesia
Zoological museums in Indonesia